Earl is a popular North American given name meaning "warrior" or "nobleman"  (originally "earl" was cognate to the Germanic title of Jarl, meaning a warrior-king). The name was sometimes used among servants of actual nobiliary earls, and instances of its usage date back to 12th-century England. Some of the holders of this name are:

 "Big" Earl, fictional alien in the video game ToeJam & Earl and its sequels
 Earl, fictional character in the animated TV series Rocko's Modern Life
 Earl Abell (1892–1956), American football player
 Earl E. Anderson (1919–2015), American general
 Earl Anthony (1938–2001), American professional bowler
 Earl Armstrong (1900–1986), Canadian politician
 Earl I. Anzai (born 1941), American politician
 Earl Averill (1902–1983), professional baseball player
 Earl Edwin Austin, American criminal
 Earl Babbie (born 1938), American sociologist
 Earl Bakken (1924–2018), American inventor of the transistorized pacemaker
 Earl Balfour (1933–2018), Canadian professional ice hockey player
 Earl Balmer (1935–2019), American NASCAR Cup Series driver
 Earl Banks (1924–1993), American football coach
 Earl Barish (born 1943), Canadian businessman
 Earl Barrett (born 1967), English former footballer
 Earl Barron (born 1981), American professional basketball player
 Earl Bassett, fictional character in the film Tremors
 Earl Battey (1935–2003), American professional baseball player
 Earl Beecham (born 1965), American football player
 Earl Bell (born 1955), American retired pole vaulter
 Earl Bennett (born 1987), American football player
 Earl Best (born 1947), American community organizer known as the 'Street Doctor'
 Earl Derr Biggers (1884–1933), American novelist and playwright
 Earl Billings (born 1945), American actor
 Earl Bird, fictional character in the comic strip Motley's Crew
 Earl Black (political scientist) (born 1942), American academic
 Earl Blaik (1897–1989), American football coach
 Earl Blumenauer (born 1948), American politician
 Earl Boen (born 1941), American actor
 Earl Bostic (1913–1965), American saxophonist
 Earl Boykins (born 1976), American basketball player
 Earl K. Brent (1914–1977), American songwriter and composer
 Earl Broady (1904–1992), American police officer, attorney, and judge
 Earl Browder (1891–1973), American communist
 Earl Brown (coach) (1915–2003), American football and basketball player and coach
 Earl Brown (basketball, born 1952) (born 1952), Puerto Rican basketball player
 Earl Johnson (disambiguation), multiple people
 Earl Jolly Brown (1939–2006), American actor
 Earl Brydges (1905–1975), American politician
 Earl "Butch" Buchholz (born 1940), American tennis player
 Earl Butz (1909–2008), American politician
 Earl Caddock (1888–1950), American professional wrestler
 Earl Caldwell (born c. 1939), American journalist
 Earl Welton Caldwell (1905–1981), American baseball player
 Earl Camembert, fictional character in the TV series SCTV
 Earl Cameron (1915–2005), Canadian broadcaster
 Earl Cameron (1917–2020), British actor
 Earl Campbell (1900–1953), Canadian ice hockey player
 Earl Campbell (born 1955), American football player
 Earl Chudoff (1907–1993), American politician
 Earl "Dutch" Clark (1906–1978), American football player
 Earl Cochell (born 1922), American tennis player
 Earl Cochran (born 1981), American football player
 Earl Cole (born 1971), American entrepreneur and television personality
 Earl Collins (1895–1958), Canadian politician
 Earl Conrad (1912–1986), American author
 Earl Cook (1908–1996), American baseball player
 Earl Cooper (1886–1965), American racecar driver
 Marion Earl Cooper (born 1957), American football player
 Earl Cranston (1840–1932), American bishop
 Earl Cureton (born 1957), American basketball player
 Earl Dawson (1925–1987), Canadian ice hockey executive and politician
 Earl Devore (1888–1928), American racecar driver
 Earl Dittman (born c. 1960), American film critic and publisher
 Earl Dodge (1932–2007), American politician
 Earl Doherty (born 1941), Canadian author
 Earl Dotson (born 1970), American football player
 Earl Douglas (radio), radio talk show producer
 Earl Durand (1913–1939), American mountain man
 Earl Duvall (1898–1969), American animator
 Earl Eby (1894–1970), American athlete
 Earl Edwards (disambiguation), multiple people
 Earl Ehrhart (born 1959), American politician
 Earl Hancock Ellis (1880–1923), U.S. Marine Corps officer
 Earl Emerson (born 1948), American novelist
 Earl Everett (born 1984), American football player
 Earl Faison (1939–2016), American football player
 Earl Kenneth Fernandes (born 1972), first Indian American Latin Rite Catholic bishop
 Earl Ferrell (born 1958), American football player
 Earl Gillespie (1922–2003), American sportscaster
 Earl Grant (1933–1970), American pianist
 Earl G. Graves, Sr. (1935–2020), American entrepreneur, publisher, businessman and philanthropist
 Earl G. Graves, Jr. (born 1962), American businessman and basketball player
 Earl Grinols (born 1951), American professor
 Earl Gros (1940–2013), American football player
 Earl Hamner Jr. (1923–2016), American writer and television producer
 Earl G. Harrison (1899–1955), American Dean of the University of Pennsylvania Law School; Commissioner of the United States Immigration and Naturalization Service, 1942–44
 Earl Hebner (born 1949), former WWE referee
 Earl Heikka (1910–1941), American sculptor 
 Earl Hickey, fictional character in the TV series My Name Is Earl
 Earl Hindman (1942–2003), American actor
 Earl Hilliard (born 1942), American politician
 Earl Hines (1903–1983), American jazz pianist
 Earl Gladstone Hunt Jr. (1918–2005), American Methodist pastor
 Earl Dewitt Hutto (1926–2020), American politician
 Earl Jones (born 1964), American track and field athlete
 Earl Keeley (born 1936), Canadian football player
 Earl Klugh (born 1953), American jazz guitarist
 Earl Floyd Kvamme (born 1938), American engineer
 Earl "Curly" Lambeau (1898–1965), founder of the Green Bay Packers
 Earl F. Landgrebe (1916–1986), American politician
 Earl C. Latourette (1889–1956), American judge
 Earl Levine (born 1968), American entrepreneur
 Earl Lovelace (born 1935), Trinidadian writer
 Earl McCarthy (born 1969), Irish freestyle swimmer
 Earl D. McIntyre, Canadian politician
 Earl C. Michener (1876–1957), American politician
 Earl R. Miller (born 1958), American diplomat
 Earl Monroe (born 1944), American basketball player
 Earl "Madman" Muntz (1914–1987), American merchandiser
 Earl Murray (1926–1994), American football player
 Earl Okine (born 1990), American football player
 Earl Pitts, fictional radio character
 Earl Edwin Pitts (born 1953), American spy
 Earl Sande (1898–1968), American Hall of Fame jockey and thoroughbred horse trainer
 Earl Scruggs (1924–2012), American banjo player
 Earl Simmons or DMX (1970–2021), American rapper and actor
 Earl Slipher (1883–1964), astronomer
 Earl Smith (1910s outfielder) (1891–1943), American baseball player
 Earl Smith (1950s outfielder) (1928–2014), American baseball player
 Earl Smith (catcher) (1897–1963), American baseball player
 Earl Smith (coach) (1917–2012), American football, basketball, and baseball coach
 Earl "Chinna" Smith (born 1955), Jamaican guitarist
 Earl E. T. Smith (1903–1991), American politician
 Earl "J. R." Smith (born 1985), American basketball player
 Earl Stevens (born 1967), American rapper better known as E-40
 Earl Stevens, Jr., E-40's son and producer better known as Droop-E
 Earl Sweatshirt (born 1994), American rapper and Odd Future member
 Earl Swensson (born 1930), American architect
 Earl Taft (1931–2021), American mathematician
 Earl Thomas Conley (1941–2019), American country singer
 Earl Van Dorn (1820–1863), former U.S Army officer
 Earl Dominic Vernius, fictional character in Prelude to Dune
 Earl Wilbur Sutherland Jr. (1915–1974), American psychologist
 Earl Warren (1891–1974), former Chief Justice of the U.S. Supreme Court
 Earl Watson (born 1979), professional basketball player
 Earl Williams (basketball player), "the Twirl" (born 1951), American-Israeli professional basketball player
 Earl Williams (1970s catcher) (1948–2013), former major league baseball player
 Earl Weaver (1930–2013), baseball manager of the Baltimore Orioles
 Earl Irvin West (1920–2011), American church historian
 Earl Wild (1915–2010), American pianist
 Early Williams (born 1951), American-Israeli basketball player
 Earl Wilson (1934–2005), former MLB pitcher
 Earl Woods (1932–2006), father of Tiger Woods
 James Earl Jones (born 1931), American actor
 Wentworth Earl Miller (born 1972), American actor

Other 
 Earl (car), nickname of a car on MythBusters
 Fictional person on television sitcom My Name Is Earl
 Earl, in the Nick Jr. sitcom Wow! Wow! Wubbzy!

See also
 Earle (given name)
 Earlene (given name)
 Errol (disambiguation)

References

English masculine given names
Given names